Rati Ram Deshbandhu Gupta (14 June 1901 – 21 November 1951), more popularly known as Lala Deshbandhu Gupta, was an Indian freedom fighter, legislator and journalist born in Panipat, Haryana to Shri Shadiram and Rajrani Gupta.

He is widely known for championing the freedom of the press and for arguing for assembly status for the National Capital Territory of Delhi. He also argued for the separation of Punjab and Haryana.

Biographical Details

Early life
Deshbandhu Gupta was born as Rati Ram Gupta in the Badi Pahad area of Panipat. His father Shadiram was a petition-writer and a Vedic scholar. He also wrote Urdu prose and poetry. 

He was 19 when he married the 17 year old Sona Devi, though their matrimonial alliance had been arranged since he was five years old and she three. He had four sons (Vishwabandhu Gupta, Prembandhu Gupta, Ramesh Gupta and Satish Gupta) and five daughters (Vimla Gupta, Nirmala Gupta, Urmila Gupta, Sarla Gupta, and Manjula Gupta).

Rati Ram Gupta completed his elementary education at a madrasa in Panipat, and then studied at St Stephen's College. Charles Indridge, Western and Ghosh taught him there, while Shri SK Rudra was the principal. 
He also worked as assistant for Shri Jamanalal Bajaj, a cloth merchant at Chandini Chowk for 18 days when he was at St Stephen's.

It was around this time that events such as the Jallianwalla Bagh massacre took place. They left their imprint on public memory at large, and on the young Rati Ram in particular. As a result, following a Non-Cooperation Conference by Mahatma M K Gandhi in Bhiwani on 22 October 1920, Deshbandhu Gupta was inspired to play a more direct role in the struggle for freedom against British rule in India. He gave the principal of the college, Shri S K Rudra, a notice to the effect that he wished to leave St Stephen's. As S K Rudra was sympathetic to the revolutionary cause, he accepted this, and is noted to have encouraged the young Rati Ram to make the best of his decision to serve the freedom struggle.

Political Activities
Deshbandhu Gupta's active involvement in political events of his time was a major factor in his inclusion in important events associated with the Indian freedom struggle. He had displayed social awareness and an interest in being part of important administration with organisations he familiar with even before joining the INC. For example, he was an active member of the Arya Samaj branch at Chawdi Bazar. He also came to hold the post of councillor of the branch at one point of time. He suffered political incarceration on a number of occasions as a result of his active involvement in the freedom struggle. He was first imprisoned at the age of 19.

He is known to have campaigned for the separation of Haryana and Punjab upon release from jail in 1927. He was supported by Ch. Ranbir Huda in this, possibly among others.

Among other members of the freedom movement, he was associated with both Lala Lajpat Rai and Swami Shraddhanand. The former was his teacher at the Tilak School of Politics. He later became the confidante of Lala Lajpat Rai.

He once  addressed a gathering in Delhi at the behest of the women's wing of the INC.  As the content of his speech was considered objectionable by the British government, he was banned from addressing any other gatherings in Delhi. As a result, Lajpat Rai assigned him the task of organising Congress committees in Karnal, which was the tehsil that his birthplace, Panipat, belonged to at the time.

The Government of India Act 1935 was passed as a result of deliberations in the Third Round Table Conference in London that was convened in November 1932. It provided for the setting up of an All India Federation and new governance models for the provinces. There were several shortcomings in the Act, the thrust of which was that, though Indians could have greater provincial administrative power, the key departments – defence and foreign relations – were still the prerogative of the British. Despite being "bitterly opposed" to the provisions of the Act, the INC went ahead with elections and formed governments in seven out of eleven provinces by July 1937, and coalition governments in two more later on. It was only Bengal and Punjab that had non-Congress governments. Punjab was ruled by the Unionist Party and Bengal by the Krishak Praja Party-Muslim League coalition. In 18 February legislative assembly elections in Punjab, only Lala Deshbandhu Gupta and Pandit Shriram Sharma won seats from the INC. 
He stayed on in the Punjab assembly for seven years. He was later elected MP from Delhi, and also held several important positions within the INC during his political career.  

It was Swami Shraddhanand and Mahatma Gandhi who gave him the title deshbandhu (friend of the nation), which came to be used as his name.

In addition to active politics, he was involved in countering the many communal riots witnessed in Delhi and many other areas in British India during this time as an outcome of growing communally-divisive forces in Indian society.

As both a journalist and Constituent Assembly member, he is known to have staunchly supported freedom of the Press in India, as especially evidenced in the debates surrounding the (then) entry 88-A in the Assembly draft, held in September 1949.

Yet another major issue he is known to have been involved with is the question of assembly status for the National Capital, Delhi. He supported the setting up of a responsible government in Delhi, which led him to oppose B. R. Ambedkar on the issue. Dr. Ambedkar supported special status for the NCT. Delhi eventually did get an assembly, though as a special Union Territory rather than a state. It is for his role in securing this that Deshbandhu Gupta is believed to have been a likely candidate for the first Chief Minister of Delhi.

The Rozana Tej
Deshbandhu Gupta was a journalist, in addition to being remembered as a freedom fighter and socialist politician. He chaired or was otherwise a part of several press editorial boards and committees, including the All India Newspaper Editors' Conference, which he also served as chief in 1950.

With Swami Shraddhanand, he started the Daily Tej newspaper, published in Urdu (as the Rozana Tej). Upon Shraddhanand's demise on 23 December 1926, Deshbandhu assumed full control of the newspaper. He also co-chaired the Indian News Chronicle along with Ram Nath Goenka, who had bought stakes to the company. After Deshbandhu's death, Goenka renamed the paper into The Indian Express.

Memorials and legacy
Nehru was one of the pall-bearers upon his demise. He is noted to have said "Aaj Dilli sooni ho gayi hai," on that occasion, which is roughly (not literally) translated as "Delhi has fallen silent today." 

The Haryana government has also announced a state-level award in his name for INR 1 lakh. The award is granted to those who make exceptional contributions towards writing regarding the freedom fighter in Haryana, where he remains relatively undocumented.

There is a college named after him, a street named after him, and a stamp with his image issued in 2010.

References 

1901 births
1951 deaths
Indian independence activists from Haryana